The National Centre for Sport and Exercise Medicine (NCSEM) is an Olympic legacy project delivering education, research and clinical services in sport, exercise and physical activity from three hubs across England. It is a collaboration of universities, healthcare trusts, local authorities and private and voluntary sector organisations.

History
The London Olympic and Paralympic games pledged to provide a lasting health legacy tackling the crucial issues currently threatening health budgets, workforce efficiency and the health of the nation. The National Centre for Sport and Exercise Medicine is a 2012 Olympics Legacy project.

Themes
The NCSEM has five themes; each target a different aspect of the value of physical activity:

 Physical activity in disease prevention
 Exercise in chronic disease
 Sports injuries and musculoskeletal health
 Mental health and wellbeing
 Performance health

Structure
The NCSEM consists of three regional hubs based in the East Midlands, London and Sheffield. In each hub, leading academics and healthcare professionals are brought together to build on existing research in the field of sport and exercise medicine and to facilitate the efficient transfer of research into frontline practice. In London the Institute of Sport Exercise and Health (ISEH) specialises in elite sports performance and sports injury management; in the East Midlands the focus is on a strong and broad research base with the aim of accelerating the translation of knowledge into clinical practice; while Sheffield concentrates on citywide testing of community initiatives to increase physical activity.

Partners
East Midlands
 University of Leicester
 Loughborough University
 University of Nottingham
 University Hospitals of Leicester NHS Trust
 Nottingham University Hospitals NHS Trust
 Nottinghamshire Healthcare NHS Foundation Trust

London
 British Olympic Association 
 English Institute of Sport
 HCA Healthcare UK
 University College London (UCL)
 University College London Hospitals NHS Foundation Trust

Sheffield
 Sheffield Teaching Hospitals NHS Foundation Trust
 Sheffield Hallam University
 The University of Sheffield
 Sheffield Children's NHS Foundation Trust
 Sheffield Health and Social Care NHS Foundation Trust
 Sheffield City Council
 Sheffield Clinical Commissioning Group
 Voluntary Action Sheffield
 Sheffield Chamber of Commerce
 Sheffield International Venues
 English Institute of Sport

See also
 Olympic Legacy Park, Sheffield

2012 establishments in England
2012 Summer Olympics
Department of Health and Social Care
Loughborough Sport
Medical research institutes in the United Kingdom
Obesity in the United Kingdom
Organisations based in the London Borough of Camden
Research institutes established in 2012
Sport in the London Borough of Camden
Sport in Leicester
Sport in Nottingham
Sport in Sheffield
Sports medicine in the United Kingdom
Sports medicine organizations
Sports organizations established in 2012
Sports organisations of England
University College London Hospitals NHS Foundation Trust
University of Leicester
University of Nottingham
National sports institutions